The Culinary Institute of St. Louis at Hickey College is a small, for-profit culinary arts career college located in St. Louis, Missouri.  The Culinary Institute of St. Louis awards associate degrees in culinary arts to graduates. A division of Hickey College, it is located on a suburban campus on Lindbergh Boulevard near the airport.  It has nearby housing for students but over half of students come from the St. Louis area. Their website states that it focuses on job placement for graduates and that financial aid is available for those who qualify.

Admissions
The admission process begins with a personal interview with an admissions representative and a tour of the facilities. Students are required to have obtained a high school diploma or GED prior to admission. Financial aid is available for those who qualify. Students may schedule a personal financial planning session to review the financial aid options available.

Academics
Culinary Institute of St. Louis at Hickey College is a specialized institution offering a 20-month culinary arts program to high school graduates.  Each day, students spend hours receiving hands-on instruction in one of five kitchens.  Students also take non-kitchen courses, almost all of which are focused on culinary arts career knowledge.  During the last semester, students complete an off-site externship.

Courses include:

 Commercial Kitchen Skills and Procedures
 Soups, Starches, and Sauces
 Meat and Poultry Arts
 Fish and Shellfish Arts
 Breads, Cakes, and Pastry Arts
 Garde Manger and Charcuterie
 Classical Cuisine
 International Cuisine

Accreditation
Culinary Institute of St Louis at Hickey College is a part of Hickey College. Hickey College is accredited by the Accrediting Council for Independent Colleges and Schools.

References

Cooking schools in the United States
For-profit universities and colleges in the United States
Universities and colleges in St. Louis